A list of films released in Japan in 1990 (see 1990 in film).

See also 
 1990 in Japan
 1990 in Japanese television

References

Footnotes

Sources

 
 
}

External links
 Japanese films of 1990 at the Internet Movie Database

1990
Japanese
Fil